Mount Petrides is a mountain with much exposed rock midway between Oehlenschlager Bluff and Mount Sinha, in southern Erickson Bluffs, Marie Byrd Land. It overlooks the confluence of Kirkpatrick and Hull Glacier from the north. Mapped by United States Geological Survey (USGS) from surveys and U.S. Navy air photos, 1959–65. Named by Advisory Committee on Antarctic Names (US-ACAN) for George A. Petrides, member of the biological party that made population studies of seals, whales and birds in the pack ice of the Bellingshausen and Amundsen Sea using USCGC Southwind and its two helicopters, 1971–72.

References

Mountains of Marie Byrd Land